"Sister Disco" is the fourth track from the Who's eighth album Who Are You. It was written by Pete Townshend.

Background

"Sister Disco" features complicated synthesizer tracks that are the result of hours Townshend spent programming an ARP 2600 synthesizer.

Pete Townshend has claimed that the song was written as a statement that The Who would never use disco elements in their music.

A music video for "Sister Disco" was also produced. The video was the 81st video ever shown on MTV. It was a concert clip taken from the Concert for the People of Kampuchea.

Lyrics

"Sister Disco" seems to mourn the death of disco, although it could be construed to be a criticism of it. However, the lyrics have been regarded by many, including Roger, as confusing.

Reception

Like the rest of Who Are You, "Sister Disco" received mixed reception. Authors Alan Parker and Steve Grantley said that the song was "neither a meaningful lyric nor a memorable melody...  it all sounds too much like hard workand not enough inspiration." AllMusic critic Richie Unterberger cited the track as a highlight of Who Are You, but noted it as one of the album's "blustery attempts at contemporary relevance."

Live history

"Sister Disco" was never performed with Keith Moon. However, it was performed regularly when The Who toured with Kenney Jones as drummer, and quickly became a live favourite, despite Townshend's claim that it was his least favourite song to perform. After not being part of The Who's setlists for several years, it was revived for their fall 2008 tour. A live recording of the song was featured on the album Concerts for the People of Kampuchea.

References

Songs written by Pete Townshend
1978 songs
The Who songs